Sowerby was a county constituency centred on the village of Sowerby in Calderdale, West Yorkshire.  It returned one Member of Parliament (MP) to the House of Commons of the Parliament of the United Kingdom.

History
The constituency was created for the 1885 general election, and abolished for the 1983 general election, when it was largely replaced by the new Calder Valley constituency.

Boundaries
1885–1918:

1918–1950: The Municipal Borough of Todmorden, the Urban Districts of Barkisland, Hebden Bridge, Luddendenfoot, Midgley, Mytholmroyd, Rishworth, Sowerby, Sowerby Bridge, and Soyland, the Rural District of Todmorden, and the civil parish of Norland in the Rural District of Halifax.

1950–1983: The Municipal Borough of Todmorden, the Urban Districts of Elland, Hebden Royd, Ripponden, and Sowerby Bridge, and the Rural District of Hepton.

Members of Parliament

Elections

Elections in the 1880s

Elections in the 1890s 

*Some sources describe Bailey as a Liberal Unionist.

Elections in the 1900s 

some sources describe as Liberal Unionist

Elections in the 1910s 

  An official Unionist candidate was selected ahead of the election, but when the writ for the election was issued, the Coalition Whips ordered the local Unionists to withdraw the candidate in favour of Higham – who was given the Coalition Coupon but then repudiated it.
Some local Unionists were angered by this state of affairs, and persuaded the local branch of the NADSS to sponsor Barker, who was known to be a Conservative. Barker then received considerable support from local Unionists during the campaign. There is no information on whether he took a whip in the House of Commons, but he voted fairly consistently with the coalition.

Elections in the 1920s

Elections in the 1930s 

General Election 1939–40:

Another General Election was required to take place before the end of 1940. The political parties had been making preparations for an election to take place from 1939 and by the end of this year, the following candidates had been selected; 
Conservative: Malcolm McCorquodale
Labour: Cyril Hackett Wilkinson

Elections in the 1940s

Elections in the 1950s

Elections in the 1960s

Elections in the 1970s

References

 Craig, F. W. S. (1983). British parliamentary election results 1918–1949 (3 ed.). Chichester: Parliamentary Research Services. .

Parliamentary constituencies in Yorkshire and the Humber (historic)
Constituencies of the Parliament of the United Kingdom established in 1885
Constituencies of the Parliament of the United Kingdom disestablished in 1983
Politics of Calderdale